Jacob Paul Rudolf (born February 18, 1926) is an American retired politician who was a Democratic member of the Connecticut Senate from 1967 to 1973, and a Republican member of the Connecticut House of Representatives from 1981 to 1983, and from 1985 to 1987. He previously served four terms on the Norwalk Common Council.

Rudolf was an unsuccessful candidate for mayor of Norwalk in 1971, being defeated by Donald J. Irwin.
He was an unsuccessful candidate for the Republican nomination for Governor of Connecticut in 1986.

References

1926 births
Possibly living people
Connecticut Democrats
Connecticut Republicans
Connecticut city council members
Connecticut state senators
Members of the Connecticut House of Representatives
Politicians from Norwalk, Connecticut